Checchi is an Italian surname. Notable people with the surname include:

Al Checchi (born 1948), American businessman
Andrea Checchi (1916–1974), Italian actor
Arturo Checchi (1886–1971), Italian artist
Cristiana Checchi (born 1977), Italian shot putter
Valerio Checchi (born 1980), Italian cross-country skier

Italian-language surnames